Graham William Dowd (born 17 December 1963) is a former rugby union player for the national team of New Zealand, the All Blacks. He was born in Takapuna.

Dowd played provincial rugby for Auckland Colts, and then from 1985 for North Harbour. He initially played as a Rugby union positions#Prop, but in 1988 was switched to hooker by his North Harbour coach Peter Thorburn. His success in his new position meant that by 1991 he was considered the second best hooker in the country, behind Sean Fitzpatrick. That year Dowd played for a New Zealand XV that beat Romania, and a New Zealand B team that beat Australia B. He was selected ahead of Warren Gatland for the All Blacks team for the 1991 Rugby World Cup.

Dowd did not play even a minute of rugby during the 1991 World Cup, and was instead confined to the reserves bench. This was repeated in 1992 when Dowd was selected for the series against an International XV, but Fitzpatrick played every minute of the three Test matches. Dowd finally made his All Black debut against Ireland that same year, when he replaced Richard Loe at prop. It would be Dowd's only ever Test appearance, but he did play in seven mid-week matches for the All Blacks that year during their tours of Australia and South Africa. He was selected in the New Zealand squad for the British Lions series in 1993, but again achieved no game time.

It was Dowd's lot to spend most of his All Black career as one of the understudies to Sean Fitzpatrick while he was at the peak of what seemed to be an indestructible hold on the hooking position. This was for some obviously a frustrating experience. But if ever the cheerful Dowd was upset he kept it very much to himself and perhaps he regarded the mere fact he was part of so many All Black squads as a bonus. For there must have been a time in Dowd's career where he never seriously contemplated gaining an All Black jersey.

By 1994 Dowd had been overtaken by Norm Hewitt as Fitzpatrick's back-up, and he never represented the All Blacks again. His provincial career finished that year, when he played his in the National Provincial Championship Final for North Harbour against Auckland – it was his 107th match for the province. He was finally awarded his All Blacks' cap at a capping ceremony in 2011 – 19 years after his sole Test match.

References

1963 births
Living people
New Zealand international rugby union players
New Zealand rugby union players
People educated at Rosmini College
North Harbour rugby union players
Rugby union props
Rugby union players from Auckland
People from Takapuna